Ján Volko (born 2 November 1996) is a Slovak sprinter. He competed in the 60 metres at the 2016 IAAF World Indoor Championships. His biggest successes to date are: the silver medal at the 2017 European Indoor Championships with a new national record of 6.58, the gold medal at the 2019 European Indoor Championships, and the bronze medal at the 2021 European Indoor Championships. In 2020, he became the "face" of the game Athletics Mania by Slovak developer PowerPlay Studio.

Volko is a practising Roman Catholic. He works with youth and was educated at the Salesian Youth Centre in Trnávka neighbourhood of Ružinov, Bratislava.

Competition record

Personal bests
Outdoor
100 metres – 10.13 NR (+1.1 m/s, Šamorín 2018; +0.2 m/s, Munich 2022)
200 metres – 20.24 (+1.6 m/s, Trnava 2018)
Indoor
60 metres – 6.55 NR (Madrid 2020)
200 metres – 20.99 NR (Metz 2021)
400 metres – 49.56 (Bratislava 2016)

References

External links
 

1996 births
Living people
Slovak male sprinters
Sportspeople from Bratislava
World Athletics Championships athletes for Slovakia
Universiade medalists in athletics (track and field)
Universiade bronze medalists for Slovakia
Athletes (track and field) at the 2015 European Games
Athletes (track and field) at the 2019 European Games
European Games medalists in athletics
European Games silver medalists for Slovakia
Competitors at the 2019 Summer Universiade
Medalists at the 2017 Summer Universiade
European Athletics Indoor Championships winners
Athletes (track and field) at the 2020 Summer Olympics
Olympic athletes of Slovakia
Slovak Roman Catholics